General Biddulph may refer to:

Michael Biddulph (British Army officer) (1823–1904), British Army general
Robert Biddulph (British Army officer) (1835–1918), British Army general
Thomas Myddelton Biddulph (1809–1878), British Army general